is a Japanese national university in Hirosaki, Aomori Prefecture, Japan. Established in 1949, it comprises five faculties: Faculty of the Humanities, Faculty of Education History, Hirosaki University Medical School History, Faculty of Science and Technology, and Faculty of Agriculture and Life Science. Its abbreviated form is Hirodai.

History

Hirosaki University was founded in May 1949. The university initially consisted of The Department of Literature and Science, The Department of Education, The Medical Department, and The Noheji Branch School.

Academics and admission

School Calendar Information
The first semester is held from April to July, while second semester is held from October to February. In each semester, students must take seven classes.

In terms of the General Fee information, an examination costs ¥9,800, entrance fee is ¥28,200, and the tuition fee is ¥14,800 per subject. Moreover, students can rent an apartment around the university, which costs about ¥25,000 to ¥30,000.

According to the university policies, foreign exchange students must submit application papers IAW written in English or Japanese within the deadlines. The term of application for the first semester is November 20, and April 20 for the second semester.

Faculties
There are currently 7 faculties in the university:

Student life

Club Activities 
There are many clubs for all students to join as well as specific clubs only for medical students. Medical students can join any club, but other students can only join clubs that are open to all students.

International Exchange Students
Hirosaki University has about 110 international students from various universities and colleges around the world. The International Exchange Center is an organization of Hirosaki University, which purpose is to make their international students do better in their studies.

Consequently, the university has a Home Visit Program which lets families in Hirosaki to accept or sponsor exchange students. There is also an English Lounge for students to practice and improve English while they study in Japan.

In addition, the university is having courses for foreign students to learn Japanese Culture, Economy and Management. If the students have high Japanese skill, they can also study with Japanese students. However, the exchange student with Japanese skills must get the permission of teacher of the class first.

Campus Activities 
Hirosaki University's School Festival is held in October every year. The students and clubs set up booths to sell things or share their interests. A main event is also held, which is a concert performed by students. On the other hand, food is sold in dozens of booths around the campus. In 2010, around 7200 people visited the festival.

Residences

Commuting and transportation
Commuting
There are those who commute to Hirosaki University. In Hirosaki, trains may only come once per an hour, so it can be inconvenient for students to commute to school: if they miss the train, they must wait another hour for the next train to come. Also, trains run slowly, so few students living in other prefectures outside of Aomori Prefecture commute daily to Hirosaki University.

Transportation
There are buses on a circular route in the city and there are a few bus stops in front of Hirosaki University. The Gakuencho and Oguriyama Oinomori lines provide service to the university.

The nearest train stations are:
Hirosaki Station: located on the Ou and Konan lines, which takes 20 minutes on foot to reach the university.
Hirokōshita Station: located on the Owani line, which takes 10 minutes on foot to reach the university.

Housing
Dormitories
There are three dorms near Hirosaki University: Hokuou-ryo, Hokumei-ryo and Hou-ryo (-ryo means "dormitory"). Each of the dorms has about 100 rooms. Hou-ryo is for women only, while the others are for men. Hou-ryo and Hokuou-ryo are both five-story buildings that are located in the Gakuen district, about 1.5 km from Hirosaki University. On the other hand, Hokumei-ryo is a four-story building in the Midorigaoka district with. In each dormitory, there are two students who can occupy one room. There is also a lounge, kitchen, and toilet on each floor. In addition, a public bath and dining room are on 1st floor. Students can take a meal every morning and evening except on Sunday during school terms.

Apartments
There are many apartments near Hirosaki University. Students decide where to live based on the style of the house, rent, area and so on.

Boarding Houses
As a general rule, there are two common things concerning boarding house: those who live in boarding houses are provided with meals daily, and the use of public facilities such as public baths, with other inhabitants.

Notable alumni
The school's notable alumni include:

Under the old system of Hirosaki High School (1920–1950)
Seijun Suzuki (1923–): A film director. He directed many films such as Branded to Kill.
Osamu Dazai (1909–1948): A novelist whose real name is Shuji Tsushima. His works include Disqualified person, Tsugaru, Shayou, and Run Meros.

The Hirosaki University (1949–)
 Tadahiro Nomura (1974–): A Judoka of 60 kg or less class who won three Olympic gold medals in 1996, 2000, 2004. He entered Graduate School of Medicine in 2009. He also learned Sports and Health Science.
 Ayumi Tanimoto (1981–): A Judoka who won the women's –63 category gold medal at the Athens Olympic Games in 2004 and at the Beijing Olympic Games in 2008. She entered Hirosaki Graduate School in Medical Researches in 2009.
 Yoshikazu Yasuhiko (1947–): An animator and manga artist, best known for Mobile Suit Gundam (1979–1980). He started attending Hirosaki University in 1966 and became a leader in the Zenkyōtō movement. He was expelled in 1969 after being arrested on suspicion of breaking and entering into the university.

References

External links 
 Hirosaki University 

1949 establishments in Japan
Educational institutions established in 1949
Hirosaki University
Universities and colleges in Aomori Prefecture
Hirosaki